Kuttur is a village in Payyanur Taluk of Kannur district in the Indian state of Kerala.

Location
Kuttur is located 17 km east of Payyanur town, 4 km away from Mathamangalam and 40 km north of  Kannur city.

Educational Institutions
 Aditya Kiran College of Applied Studies, Kuttoor
 Jaybees Training College of B. Ed., Kuttoor

Demographics
As of 2011 Census, Kuttoor village had a population of 8,143 where 3,821 are males and 4,322 females. Population in the age group 0-6 was 875 (10.7%) which constitutes 432 males and 443 females. Kuttoor had overall literacy of 92.3% where male literacy stands at 96.2% and female literacy was 88.9%.

Transportation
The national highway(NH 66) passes through Perumba junction. Goa and Mumbai can be accessed on the northern side and Cochin and Thiruvananthapuram can be accessed on the southern side.  The road to the east of Iritty connects to Mysore and Bangalore.  The nearest railway station is Payyanur on Shoranur-Mangalore section under Southern Railway.
The nearest airport is Kannur, about 54 km away.

See also
 Mathamangalam
 Eramam
 Vellora

References

Villages near Payyanur
Villages in Kannur district